Kang's Kitchen is a South Korean travel-reality show. It is a spin-off of the variety show New Journey to the West. The show airs every Fridays at 9.10 pm(Korea) on cable channel tvN starting from December 5, 2017.

The show was a success, recording an average rating of 8.3 percent, with its peak at 9.1 percent.

On 12 December 2018's episode of New Journey to the West, it was revealed by producer Na Young-seok that season 2 of the show is in the works, with P.O joining the cast. The second and third season aired in the summer of 2019.

Synopsis
Members of New Journey to the West season four runs a restaurant on Jeju Island.

During the Season 4 of New Journey to the West, members had the opportunity to shoot their version of Youn's Kitchen in exchange for their prizes - a Lamborghini and a Porsche. The cars were an inside joke among the producers & scriptwriters, as they didn't think the members will be able to win, which ultimately backfired.

Kang Ho-dong, a rookie chef who is challenging cooking for the first time in his life, and members of staff at a restaurant will be responsible for preparing ingredients, ordering food, and entertaining guests. Kang's Kitchen is held in Hallym, Jeju Island, and pork cutlet is served to the guests of 10 teams selected through lottery.

Airtime

Cast

Main Cast
Kang Ho-dong : Head chef
Eun Ji-won : Hall manager
Lee Soo-geun : Part-timer
Ahn Jae-hyun : Sous chef
Song Min-ho : Part-timer
P.O : Sous Chef
Cho Kyu-hyun : Head Chef

Guest
Baek Jong-won
Na Young-seok : Na Slave

Timeline

Menu

Season 1
Main Dish
Tonkatsu
Kang Ho-dong (XXL)
Lee Soo-geun (Small)
Omurice
Ramyeon
Samgyeopsal Kimbap

Season 2
Main Dish
Garak-guksu
Hot
Cold
Bibim
Tteok-bokki
Medium
Large
Jajang-Tteok-bokki
Kimchi fried rice
Jajang-Omurice

Dessert
Patbingsu
Mango Parfait
Ice cream

Season 3
Main Dish
Pizza
Kang Ho-dong (60 cm)
Lee Soo-geun (20 cm)
Bulgogi Pasta
Cream Pasta
Kimchi fried rice
Jajang-Omurice
Dessert
Patbingsu
Ice Cream
Parfait
Mango
Strawberry

Ratings
In the table below,  represent the lowest ratings and  represent the highest ratings.

References

External links
  

South Korean travel television series
South Korean variety television shows
TVN (South Korean TV channel) original programming
Mass media in Korea
Travel web series
2017 South Korean television series debuts
Korean-language television shows
2018 South Korean television series endings